Parmacellilla filipowitschi is a species of predatory air-breathing land slug. It is a shell-less pulmonate gastropod mollusc in the family Trigonochlamydidae.

Parmacellilla filipowitschi is the only species in the genus Parmacellilla, which in turn is the only genus in the subfamily Parmacellillinae.

The generic name Parmacellilla is based on its similarity to the genus Parmacella. The specific name filipowitschi is in honor of E. M. Filipowitsch, who collected the type specimen in 1905.

Distribution 
The type locality is Gorgan (also known as Astrabad) in Iran.

References

Trigonochlamydidae